The Crewe–Derby line is a railway line in central England, running from Crewe in a south-easterly direction to Derby, via Stoke-on-Trent and Uttoxeter. Passenger services on the line are provided by East Midlands Railway.

History
This line was opened by the North Staffordshire Railway Company and became part of the London Midland and Scottish Railway in 1923.

The line was opened between Stoke and Uttoxeter on 7 August 1848. The next stage from here to Tutbury was opened 11 September 1848. Just beyond Tutbury was formerly a branch line to Burton upon Trent, having opened on the same date, but now closed.

A separate company, the Cheadle Railway Company, built a line from Cresswell to Cheadle, which was opened throughout on 1 January 1901 and was closed to passengers in 1953 and to freight traffic in 1978.

The section of line between Egginton and the Midland Railway Derby to Birmingham line was opened on 13 July 1849. The section between Stoke and Kidsgrove is part of the West Coast Main Line, which together with the section from Kidsgrove to Crewe opened on 9 October 1848.

When Central Trains were awarded the franchise for the line in the 1990s, the Crewe-Derby service (which under BR Regional Railways had run between Crewe, Derby and Nottingham then either Lincoln or Skegness) was expanded to run between Manchester Airport and Skegness. However, poor punctuality meant that this was later curtailed to Crewe-Skegness. In Autumn 2005, further poor performance saw the through service limited to Crewe-Derby.

During 2003 much of the line was closed as part of the West Coast Main Line upgrade with trains terminating at Blythe Bridge and a shuttle bus service running between there and Crewe. After the closure all stations on the route reopened except  which was closed in 2005. As a result of the upgrade the section from Crewe to Kidsgrove was electrified for use as a diversionary route for the West Coast Main Line.

In May 2021, services provided by East Midlands Railway were extended to provide Crewe and Stoke-on-Trent with direct links past Derby to Nottingham and Newark Castle, although the service is still run hourly and journeys between Stoke-on-Trent and Nottingham take approximately 90 minutes.

Stations

The line serves or has formerly served the following places (highlighted place names currently have a station whereas the others formerly had a named station that is now closed):

Crewe; Radway Green and Barthomley; Alsager; Kidsgrove; Chatterley; Longport; Etruria; Stoke-on-Trent; Fenton; Longton; Normacot; Meir; Blythe Bridge; Cresswell; Leigh; Bramshall; Uttoxeter; Marchington; Sudbury; Scropton; Tutbury and Hatton; Egginton; Pear Tree and Normanton; and Derby.

Route

The route is double track for all of its length except for a three-mile section between Alsager and Crewe, which was singled by British Rail. Whilst the majority of the route is not electrified, the section between Stoke Junction and Crewe is as part of the West Coast Main Line.

In April 2006, Network Rail organised its maintenance and train control operations into "26 Routes". The line from Crewe to Kidsgrove (where it joins the line from Manchester) through to Stoke-on-Trent forms part of Route 18 (the West Coast Main Line). The line through to Derby from the junction just south of Stoke-on-Trent station forms part of Route 19 (the Midland Main Line and East Midlands).

Services

The majority of services on the route from December 2008 to February 2020 were provided by single car Class 153 "Super Sprinter" Diesel Multiple Units, however Class 158 "Express Sprinter" and Class 156 "Super Sprinter" units were occasionally used.

From February 2020, the new East Midlands Railway franchise started running Class 153 DMUs in double formation, and occasionally, Class 156 DMUs, however, overcrowding remained a major issue on the route, particularly in the morning and evening peak, and on weekends. Passengers are occasionally left behind.

With the reintroduction of Class 170 "Turbostar" services on this route, which started in late November 2020, capacity limitations are expected to be eased, with Class 153 and Class 156 DMUs expected to be retired from the route in 2021.

Future
Under the new East Midlands Railway franchise, most trains have increased in capacity, with Class 153 DMUs now mostly running in double formation and occasionally being joined by Class 156 DMUs. Local MP Jack Brereton has also called for  railway station to be re-opened.

References

Rail transport in Cheshire
Rail transport in Staffordshire
Rail transport in Derbyshire
Rail transport in Derby
Railway lines opened in 1848
Railway lines in the East Midlands
Railway lines in North West England
Railway lines in the West Midlands (region)
Standard gauge railways in England